Derakht-e Bid may refer to:
 Derakht-e Bid, Fariman
 Derakht-e Bid, Mashhad
 Derakht-e Bid, Torbat-e Jam
 Derakht-e Bid-e Olya
 Derakht-e Bid-e Sofla